Babar Kot is an archeological site belonging to the Indus Valley civilisation and is located in the Saurashtra region of Gujarat, India.

Excavation
Gregory Possehl, of University of Pennsylvania has undertaken a detailed study at this site as well as at Rojdi and Oriyo timbo.

Historical significance
This site is classified as belonging to the Late Harappan period and measures about 2.7 hectares; Babar Kot had a stone fortification wall.

Plant findings
Findings from this site include plant remains of millets, gram and bajra (pennisetum typhoideum) among other findings. Furthermore, it is indicated that Bajra might have been present at this site during the third millennium BCE. An archaeological study using ethnographic models provided evidence of two crops at Babar kot, one in summer and another during winter.

Animal findings
Findings from this site also included animal remains of cattle, goat, sheep, and pigs. An archaeological study revealed evidence of eleucine coracana, which probably was used as green fodder for the animals.

See also

 List of Indus Valley Civilization sites
Pabumath
Desalpur

References

External links

Indus Valley civilisation sites
Archaeological sites in Gujarat
Former populated places in India
Geography of Gujarat
Tourist attractions in Gujarat